Kanagawa Prefectural Kawawa High School (神奈川県立川和高等学校, Kanagawa Kenritsu Kawawa Kōtōgakkō) is a high school in Tsuzuki-ku, Yokohama, Japan, founded in 1962. The school is operated by the Kanagawa Prefectural Board of Education.

References

Notable students and teachers
Hideki Arai

External links
 School Website 

High schools in Yokohama
Educational institutions established in 1962
1962 establishments in Japan